Serovpe (Servitchen) Vitchenian (born Constantinople, Ottoman Empire 1815  died 1897) was a prominent Ottoman Armenian physician, educator, journalist, writer, and politician. He was the founder of the first Ottoman medical journal. He was also a key figure in the promulgation of the Armenian National Constitution in 1863.

References 

1815 births
1897 deaths
Armenian physicians
Armenian educators
Armenian male writers
Armenian politicians
Physicians from Istanbul
Armenians from the Ottoman Empire
Politicians from Istanbul